Bang Hyun-sung (born 16 June  1991), professionally known as Ryan Bang, is a South Korean television personality, host, comedian, actor, singer and vlogger based in the Philippines. Bang is one of a few Korean expatriates to appear prominently in Philippine television; other notable expatriates are Sandara Park, Sam Oh and Grace Lee. He rose to fame in the Philippines through the reality show Pinoy Big Brother: Teen Clash 2010, where he finished as second runner-up. He was the host of his first show 3ow Powhz!, aired on Studio 23 from 2010 to 2011. A former guest judge on the ABS-CBN variety show It's Showtime, Bang became one of the regular hosts since 2012. He is the main host of reality show Dream Maker.

Personal life
Bang is an only child, was born on 16 June 1991 to a government official father and housewife mother.

Tax evasion
In January 2013, the Bureau of Internal Revenue (BIR) filed a tax evasion complaint with the Department of Justice (DOJ) against Bang for failure to pay his taxes in 2010 and 2011. The BIR sued him for a tax liability amounting to ₱1.82 million, including surcharges and interests. In February 2013, Bang stated that he would like to make a personal appearance at the BIR to apologize for the incident. He was eager to resolve the case, and reasoned that he was still a high school student in 2010, and thus unaware of his responsibility to the Philippine government, in light of his income from the entertainment sector.

Relationship
In 2010, Bang was romantically interested in Filipina singer Yeng Constantino.

Career
In May 2010, Ryan Bang entered the Pinoy Big Brother house, along with ten other international housemates, after a Filipino friend encouraged him to join the reality show. After 56 days, he garnered enough votes to reach the Big Night, where he won as Second Big Placer by getting 18.70% of the entire votes.

In August 2010, Bang appeared as one of the guest judges in the comedy variety show Showtime, and stayed on from 16 August 2010 until 8 October 2011. He also formerly hosted his own show 3ow Powhz on Studio 23, also appeared in the comedy gag show Banana Split, and made guest apperaances on Kim Atienza's program Matanglawin. On the 1 January 2011 episode of showbiz talk show Entertainment Live, Bang was named one of 2010's breakthrough artists. On 25 May 2011, he released an album entitled I Lilly Lilly Like It: Ryan Bang Party Party Hits!.

Filmography

Television

Film

Discography

Studio albums

Single

Awards and nominations

References

External links

1991 births
Living people
ABS-CBN personalities
Pinoy Big Brother contestants
Viva Records (Philippines) artists
South Korean expatriates in the Philippines
South Korean male television actors
South Korean television personalities
South Korean male film actors
South Korean pop singers
21st-century South Korean male singers
Star Magic
South Korean male comedians